The 2019 Lory Meagher Cup is the 11th staging of the Lory Meagher Cup, the Gaelic Athletic Association's fifth tier inter-county hurling championship. The draw for the 2019 fixtures took place on 24 October 2018.

Group stage

Table 
{| class="wikitable" style="text-align:center"
! width="20" |
! width="150" style="text-align:left;" |Team
! width="20" |
! width="20" |
! width="20" |
! width="20" |
! width="30" |
! width="50" |
! width="20" |
! width="20" |
!Qualification
|- style="background:#ccffcc"
|1|| align="left" | Lancashire ||3||2||0||1||64||47||17||4
| rowspan="2" |Advance to Final
|- style="background:#ccffcc" 
|2|| align="left" | Leitrim ||3||2||0||1||61||55||6||4
|- 
|3|| align="left" | Fermanagh ||3||2||0||1||57||53||4||4
|
|- 
|4|| align="left" | Cavan ||3||0||0||3||40||67||-27||0
|
|}

Round Robin Fixtures

Round 1

Round 2

Round 3

Final

Leitrim are promoted to the Nicky Rackard Cup 2020.

References

Lory
Lory Meagher Cup